The East Coast Eagles is an Australian rules football club competing in the Sydney AFL competition based out of the Sydney suburb of Rouse Hill, New South Wales.

Previously known as the Baulkham Hills Falcons (1976–1999) and Sydney Hills Eagles (2012–2014) and wearing maroon and gold, the team wears the West Coast Eagles uniforms of blue and Gold.

History
The history of the Sydney Hills Eagles can be traced back to the formation of the Baulkham hills junior Australian football club in 1976.  Since 1976 Baulkham Hills has fielded teams in all age groups in the major junior competition in suburban Sydney.  Baulkham Hills are the most successful junior club in Sydney, having enough players to field two teams in every age group in most seasons and more often than not winning the premiership.  In the mid-to-late 1980s it was not uncommon for two Baulkham Hills teams (then known as the Hawks and the Kookaburras) to play each other in grand finals.

In 1988, the club had enough numbers to field an under 19 team in the Sydney Football League.  As the Sydney University club could not field an under 19 team, Baulkham Hills played in their stead.  The team had a successful season, eventually finishing in fourth place after losing the first semi-final to Pennant Hills.  As this team was an amalgamation of players from the Hawks and the Kookaburras, a new emblem – the Falcons – was born.  The team played in a maroon jersey with gold stripes, similar to the jersey of the Subiaco club playing in the WAFL. 

In the early 80s Baulkham Hills played in the SDSFA at their home ground at the Kellyville Postal Institute Club, then later moved to Charles McLaughlin Reserve. This period of the club was not a successful one and both the First and Reserve Grade teams went long periods without wins.

In 1989, the club fielded a senior team competing in the Sydney Football Association (Division 2) competition.  The team met with moderate success in their first year, finishing fourth in a seven team competition, being knocked out of the finals race in the first semi-final.

In 1990 the club had gathered enough support from ex-junior players and disenchanted players from other clubs to field teams in the Sydney Football Association (SFA) Division 1 competition in the first grade, reserve grade and under 20 competitions.  1990 was a successful season, with the first grade team eventually losing the Grand Final to Balmain at Erskineville Oval and Doug Scholz winning the Snow Medal for the best and fairest player in the competition.

In the following year the Falcons turned the tables on Balmain and won their first senior premiership in a keenly fought match at Roger Sheeran Oval.

By 1993 the club had outgrown the SFA and was promoted to the Sydney Football League.  The Falcons endured a tough couple of years in 1993 and 1994 before making the preliminary final in 1995.  It was in 1995 that the club produced its first Phelan Medallist in ruckman Graham Jones.

Between 1996 and 1999 the club struggled, never finishing higher than fifth on the ladder.  One high point for the club during these lean years was Jarrod Crosby winning the club's second Phelan Medal in 1998.

Before the 2000 season began, the club struck up a partnership with the West Coast Eagles and was renamed the East Coast Eagles. the club adopted their new playing strip of blue and yellow.

In 2006, the club were undefeated through the home and away season, and easily won their second semi final to qualify for the grand final. But in a shock result, the Eagles suffered their only loss of the season on grand final day, going down by 2 points to Pennant Hills in wet conditions at Henson Park.

In 2008 the club finished the season in fourth before defeating North Shore (by 50 points), St George (by 65) and UNSW/Eastern Suburbs (by 45) to reach their second Grand Final in three years against archrivals Pennant Hills. Despite trailing by just 17 points at half time, the Eagles ended up going down by 104 points.

In 2009 the club moved to their new oval Bruce Purser Reserve on the corner of Withers Rd and Commercial Rd, Rouse Hill

In 2009, The East Coast Eagles won their first ever AFL Sydney Premiership, winning the Grand Final against UNSW/Eastern Suburbs 22.12 (144) to 13.12 (90). Gus Seebeck kicked 10 goals for the game.

Captain, Jon Vlatko was named as the Club Champion in 2009, with Gus Seebeck finishing as runner up. Mark Skuse was announced as the Player's Player. In Division 1, Josh Shepherd claimed his third straight Best and Fairest award at the club by winning the Bill McLeod Medal, after taking out the Premier Cup Under 18's Best and Fairest award in 2007 and 2008.

In 2010, the Eagles did it again securing Back to Back Premierships by defeating Sydney Uni at Blacktown Olympic Park - 13.9 (87) to 10.10 (70). Damien Bowles claimed his first Club Champion medallion to go with his Rod Podbury Medal on Grand Final Day. Damien was unlucky not to also claim the League's Phelan Medal when after polling the most votes, he was ruled ineligible owing to suspension during the season.

The U/18 Premier Cup lads were beaten in the Grand Final by 6 points after extra time by Sydney University.  Luke McLeod won the Division One medal named after his father Bill. James Ford took out the Division Three B&F whilst Dean Costello and Adam Hutt won their respective U/18 awards in Premier and Challenge Cup.

Following the completion of the 2011 season, the club was admitted to the North East Australian Football League and subsequently the name of the club was changed to the Sydney Hills Eagles.

In December 2012, it was announced that Marc Dragicevic had been recruited as coach of the Eagles' NEAFL team.

The years of 2012, 2013 and 2014 were spent playing in the NEAFL competition as the Sydney Hills Eagles, however in 2015 the Club withdrew from the NEAFL and returned to AFL Sydney where it fields four teams in Premier Division, Div One, Div Three and Under 19's.

The year of 2016 bought in the club's first Premier Division flag since its re-introduction to the Sydney AFL which saw Michael Sankey and Jon Vlakto hold the Premier Division Cup for the 2016 season, avenging the loss in 2015.

AFL players
There is a list of Eagles players who have played at AFL as Sydney Swans.
Nathan Gordon (Sydney Swans and Richmond)
Ryan Houlihan (Carlton)
Dion Myles (Sydney Swans)
Terry Thripp (Sydney Swans)
Sanford Wheeler (Sydney Swans)

Honours 
 Sydney AFL (3): 2009, 2010, 2011, 2016

Grand Finals detail

External links

Official East Coast Eagles Website
Official Baulkham Hills Hawks Website
Full Points Footy Profile for East Coast Eagles
Full history of the East Coast Eagles AFL Football Club

References

Australian rules football clubs in Sydney
1976 establishments in Australia
Australian rules football clubs established in 1976